Bechet is a crater on Mercury, located near the north pole.  Most of the crater floor is in permanent shadow.

Its name was adopted by the International Astronomical Union in 2013, for the American jazz musician and composer Sidney Bechet.

References

Impact craters on Mercury